Gò Công Tây (or West Gò Công) is a rural district (huyện) of Tiền Giang province in the Mekong Delta region of Vietnam, was established in 13 April 1979. As of 2003 the district had a population of 166,487. The district covers an area of 272 km². The district capital lies at Vĩnh Bình.

References

Districts of Tiền Giang province